This is a list of Monuments of National Importance as officially recognized by and available through the website of the Archaeological Survey of India in the Indian state Uttarakhand. The monument identifier is a combination of the abbreviation of the subdivision of the list (state, ASI circle) and the numbering as published on the website of the ASI. 44 Monuments of National Importance have been recognized by the ASI in Uttarakhand.

List of monuments of national importance 

|}

See also 
 List of State Protected Monuments in Uttarakhand

Footnotes and references 

Uttarakhand
Monuments of National Importance
Monuments and memorials in Uttarakhand